Gervasio González "Strique" Ojarul (1884 – death date unknown) was a Cuban baseball catcher in the Cuban League and Negro leagues. He played from 1901 to 1917 with several ballclubs, including San Francisco, Almendares, Club Fé, Habana, Azul, and the Cuban Stars (West). He was elected to the Cuban Baseball Hall of Fame in 1939.

References

External links

1884 births
Year of death missing
Cuban League players
Eminencia players
Punzo players
Almendares (baseball) players
Club Fé players
Azul (baseball) players
Cuban Stars (West) players
San Francisco (baseball) players
Baseball catchers
Cuban expatriate baseball players in the United States